Medicine Hat Airport  is located  southwest of Medicine Hat, Alberta, Canada. WestJet Link services the airport daily from Calgary.

During World War II the site was used as part of the British Commonwealth Air Training Plan (BCATP).

Airlines and destinations

Passenger

History

Aerodrome
Six runways were listed as follows:

Relief landing field - Holsom
Three runways were listed as follows:

Second World War training
RCAF Station Medicine Hat was home to No. 34 Service Flying Training School (SFTS) of the Royal Air Force, which became part of the British Commonwealth Air Training Plan. The SFTS was open from 8 April 1941 to 17 November 1944. In 1939, the Department of National Defence appropriated the Medicine Hat Exhibition and Stampede Grounds, which was also used as a prisoner of war camp.

See also
Medicine Hat/Schlenker Airport

References

External links

Place to Fly on COPA's Places to Fly airport directory

Certified airports in Alberta
Medicine Hat
Medicine Hat